Kfar Ruppin (lit. A member of the Kibbutz Movement, it falls under the jurisdiction of Valley of Springs Regional Council.

History
The kibbutz was founded in 1938 by the "Massad" group as part of the tower and stockade enterprise. The first residents were members of the Noar Haoved youth movement immigrants from Germany, Bohemia and Austria, and former members of a labour group from Herzliya. It was named in honour of Arthur Ruppin, a Zionist leader who was at the time the head of the Settlement Department of the Jewish Agency and who helped the group with establishing the kibbutz as part of his effort to develop Jewish settlement in the Land of Israel. The small group of settlers was facing very harsh living conditions, which led their parent movement to direct some 80 members of the "BeNativ" group to join them in 1942. Most of these had arrived from Czechoslovakia travelling on illegal immigrant ships.

Kfar Ruppin uses lands that belonged to the depopulated Palestinian village of Masil al-Jizl.

From 2017, the Mekhinat HaEmek (מכינת העמ"ק) pre-army preparatory academy moved to the kibbutz from the close by moshav Tel Te'omim. The mechina was established in 2006 and admits both religious and secular  men and women. It is now in its twelfth session; learn and volunteer on the kibbutz and the surrounding area.

Economy
As of 2016, Kfar Ruppin's economy was fully privatised.

In 2016, the largest part of the kibbutz revenue came from the privately managed "Palkar" factory, established in 1978 for the production of plastic goods and already managed by an external company in 2000.

Kfar Ruppin still has strong agricultural activities, with fish farming including ornamental fish breeding, dairy and chicken farms, date and red grapefruit plantations, and wheat and maize crops.

Birdwatching
The area is known for birdwatching due to its location on one of the most important bird migration flyways between Europe and Africa.  A bird ringing station is also located there. The kibbutz culture hall, built in 1965 on a hill near the original tower and stockade structures, is being converted into a birdwatching observatory and research center.

Landmarks
Kfar Ruppin has a  public garden on the grounds of the kibbutz.

Near the kibbutz is an archaeological site called Tel Tsaf, a 7,000-year-old prehistoric village which has produced the largest database of materials from the Neolithic to the Chalcolithic periods.

Notable people
 Efrat Natan

See also
Wildlife in Israel
Tourism in Israel

References

External links
Official website 
Gardens of Kibbutz Kfar Ruppin
Kfar Ruppin Birdwatching Center

Populated places established in 1938
1938 establishments in Mandatory Palestine
Kibbutzim
Kibbutz Movement
Populated places in Northern District (Israel)
Austrian-Jewish culture in Israel
Czech-Jewish culture in Israel
German-Jewish culture in Israel